Alhaji Adamu Atta (October 18, 1927 – May 1, 2014) was the first civilian governor of the Nigerian Kwara State during the Second Republic, representing the National Party of Nigeria (NPN).

Background
Adamu Atta belonged to Indigenous peoples of Ebira land, in the present Kogi State. Born in Okene in 1927, he  was the son of warrant chief Ibrahima Atta, whom the British granted wide powers under the Native Authority system, which undermined the traditional process for selection of a leader in the community.

He became the first civilian governor of the state, representing the National Party of Nigeria (NPN), although he came from a minority ethnic group.
In January 1967, he was permanent secretary for the federal Ministry of Finance, and was in discussions with the Soviet Union over possible development loans.

Governor of Kwara State
Atta defeated Obatemi Usman for a seat in the Constituent Assembly in 1977. Usman appealed the vote to his Oziogu clan, accusing the Aniku sub-clan of Adavi, to which Atta belonged, of occupying most of the public offices in Ebira land.

Atta was responsible for establishing the Obangede Specialist Hospital.

Dead 
 Alhaji Adamu Attah, is dead on Thursday in his Abuja residence after a protracted illnessHe was buried in his Kuroko, Okene residence at about 5 p.m. according to Islamic rite, aged 83.

References

1927 births
2014 deaths
Alumni of Achimota School
Governors of Kwara State
National Party of Nigeria politicians